Francis Kyte (active 1710 - 1744) was an English engraver and portrait painter.

Having worked for two decades as a mezzotint engraver, engraving portraits of famous or fashionable people for the publishing trade in London, in particular for printsellers Edward Cooper and later also for John Bowles, for whom he made 32 mezzotint portraits for Bowles' "Worthies of Britain" series, during the 1740s Kyte commenced painting  portraits himself. Kyte's portrait of George Frederick Handel is on view at the Handel House Museum, London.

References

Notes

18th-century English painters
English male painters
English portrait painters
Year of birth missing
Year of death missing
18th-century English male artists